Harvey Johnson may refer to:

 Harvey E. Johnson Jr., retired US Vice Admiral and C.O.O. of the Federal Emergency Management Agency (FEMA)  
 Harvey H. Johnson (1808–1896), U.S. Congressional Representative from Ohio
 Harvey Johnson Jr. (born 1946), mayor of Jackson, Mississippi, 1997–2005, 2009-present
 Harvey Johnson (Australian footballer) (1907–1948), Australian rules footballer for Hawthorn
 Harvey Johnson (coach) (1919–1983), former Buffalo Bills head coach
 Harvey Johnson (reverend) (1843–1923), African American pastor, activist, and leader of the Union Baptist Church
 Harvey L. Johnson (1904–1995), American scholar of Latin America
 Captain Harvey Johnson, British officer of the native Junagadh State which was annexed by the newly independent India in 1947
 Harvey Johnson, fictional character on Australian soap opera Neighbours
 Harvey Johnson, fictional character in musical Bye Bye Birdie